Sir Julius Chan  (born 29 August 1939) served as Prime Minister of Papua New Guinea from 1980 to 1982 and from 1994 to 1997. He is Member of Parliament for New Ireland Province, having won the seat in the 2007 national election. He is also the current Governor of New Ireland Province, since 2007. On 26 May 2019, Prime Minister Peter O'Neill announced he would soon resign and that he wished for Sir Julius to succeed him. An outgoing Prime Minister does not, however, have the power to appoint his successor, and the following day O'Neill delayed his own formal resignation. He was also a leading figure in his country during the years-long Bougainville conflict.

Early life
Chan was born as the fifth child out of seven children on the Tanga Islands in the Territory of New Guinea, in what is now New Ireland Province, the son of Chin Pak (陳柏), a trader from Taishan, China and Miriam Tinkoris, a native New Irelander. He was educated at Marist College Ashgrove in Brisbane, Queensland, Australia.

Early political career
Chan first became actively involved in politics in the 1960s. He was elected to represent the Namatanai district of New Ireland province in the pre-independence House of Assembly in 1968 and was re-elected in 1972, 1977, 1982, 1987 and 1992. He was Deputy Prime Minister four times (1976, 1985, 1986, 1992–1994), and Minister of Finance three times (1972–1977, 1985-1986 and 1992–1994). He also held the portfolios of Primary Industry (1977–78) and External Affairs and Trade (1994). Chan became leader of the People's Progress Party in 1970. He was knighted as a Knight Commander of the Order of the British Empire (KBE) in 1981, and appointed a Privy Counsellor the next year.

Prime minister
Chan first became prime minister on 11 March 1980, succeeding the country's first prime minister, Michael Somare. He served as prime minister until 2 August 1982, when Somare regained the position.

He succeeded Prime Minister Paias Wingti in August 1994 and took office on the dual platform of national security and appropriate economic management. In 1997, the Chan government's multimillion-dollar contract with Sandline International, a mercenary organization, to counter separatist guerrilla warfare on Bougainville caused the Sandline affair, with immense public protests and a 10-day mutiny by the underpaid national army. On 25 March 1997, during an inquiry that started on 21 March that caused five ministers to resign, the Parliament defeated a motion calling on Chan to resign (59-38). However, the next day, Chan and two ministers chose to step down, and John Giheno, a member of Chan's party, became acting prime minister a day later. He regained the position on 2 June 1997, shortly before the national elections. Chan was defeated in the national election in June 1997 and was succeeded as prime minister by Bill Skate on 22 July 1997. He remained out of Parliament until winning the New Ireland Provincial seat in the June–July 2007 election.

Later career
During the "horse trading" phase of negotiations following the 2007 election, Chan was nominated for the position of prime minister, with the backing of Mekere Morauta and Bart Philemon, as an alternative to the large National Alliance grouping which appeared likely to again be led by Somare. Parliamentary Speaker Jeffrey Nape rejected Chan's nomination as a candidate and Somare won the vote to become Prime Minister without opposition on 13 August, while 21 members of Parliament joined Chan's opposition group.

Personal life
Chan married Stella, Lady Chan in 1966 and has four children: Vanessa Andrea, Byron James, Mark Gavin, and Toea Julius. His son Byron Chan was Member of Parliament for Namatanai Open electorate, covering the south of New Ireland from 2002 until 2017.

See also

References

Living people
1939 births
Governors of New Ireland Province
Prime Ministers of Papua New Guinea
Deputy Prime Ministers of Papua New Guinea
Ministers of Internal Finance of Papua New Guinea
Ministers of Finance of Papua New Guinea
Ministers of Primary Industry of Papua New Guinea
Leaders of political parties in Papua New Guinea
Members of the House of Assembly of Papua and New Guinea
Members of the National Parliament of Papua New Guinea
Grand Companions of the Order of Logohu
Knights Grand Cross of the Order of St Michael and St George
Knights Commander of the Order of the British Empire
Members of the Privy Council of the United Kingdom
Papua New Guinean people of Chinese descent
Papua New Guinean politicians of Chinese descent
People from New Ireland Province
People from Namatanai
People from Matalai
People from Tanga Islands
People's Progress Party politicians
20th-century Papua New Guinean politicians
21st-century Papua New Guinean politicians